The U.S. state of Utah first required its residents to register their motor vehicles in 1909. Registrants provided their own license plates for display until 1915, when the state began to issue plates.

, plates are issued by the Utah State Tax Commission through its Division of Motor Vehicles. Front and rear plates are required for most classes of vehicles, while only rear plates are required for motorcycles and trailers.

Passenger baseplates

1915 to 1967 
The 1954 (dated 1955) issue was the first Utah license plate that complied with these standards.

1968 to present

Non-passenger plates

Discontinued

Optional plates 
Utah currently offers over 60 optional license plates. With the exception of the Amateur Radio Operator plate, all use the same serial format – originally 1234A (with a high of 4285U), then A123B (A001A to M999Z), now 12AB3.

Discontinued

References

External links 
 Utah license plates, 1969–present
 Zuls Plate Page

Utah
Utah transportation-related lists
Transportation in Utah